The Federal Party was a party in the Federation of Rhodesia and Nyasaland.

History
The Federal Party was formed on 7 August 1953 by the leaders of the ruling parties in the three territories in order to contest the  federal elections in December. The elections saw the new party win 24 of the 35 seats. In the general elections in Northern Rhodesia the following year, it won ten of the twelve elected seats.

In November 1957 the Federal Party merged with the United Rhodesia Party to form the United Federal Party.

References

Political parties established in 1953
1953 establishments in Northern Rhodesia
1953 establishments in Nyasaland
1953 establishments in Southern Rhodesia
Political parties disestablished in 1957
1957 disestablishments in Northern Rhodesia
1957 disestablishments in Nyasaland
1957 disestablishments in Southern Rhodesia
Defunct political parties in Malawi
Defunct political parties in Zambia
Defunct political parties in Zimbabwe
Political parties in Rhodesia